There have been two baronetcies created for members of the Puckering family.

The Baronetcy of Puckering of Weston, Hertfordshire was created on 25 November 1611, in the Baronetage of England, for Thomas Puckering, the son of Sir John Puckering (d 1596) Attorney General and Lord Keeper of the Great Seal to Queen Elizabeth I.

Puckering was Member of Parliament for Tamworth on four occasions 1621-1629 and was High Sheriff of Warwickshire in 1625. He resided at Priory House, Warwick.

The baronetcy was extinct on his death without male issue but his estates passed to his nephew Sir Henry Newton (see below).

The Baronetcy of Puckering of Charlton, Kent was created in the Baronetage of England on 2 April 1620 for Adam Newton, Dean of Durham and tutor to Henry Frederick, Prince of Wales, son of King James I.

Newton married a daughter of Sir Thomas Puckering (above). He bought the Manor of Charlton in 1607 and built the Jacobean mansion known as Charlton House.

His son Henry Newton, 3rd Baronet, changed his surname to Puckering upon inheriting the estates of his uncle Sir Thomas Puckering. He was Member of Parliament for Warwick in 1661 and 1679. He bought an estate at Woodcote, Warwickshire in 1657.

The baronetcy became extinct on his death.

Puckering of Weston (1611)
 Sir Thomas Puckering, 1st Baronet (died 1636)

Puckering of Charlton (1620)
 Sir Adam Newton, 1st Baronet (died 1630)
 Sir William Newton, 2nd Baronet (died 1635)
 Sir Henry Puckering, 3rd Baronet (1618–1700)

References

  A History of the County of Hertford, Volume 3 (1912) pp 171 -177 from British History Online
  The Environs of London, Volume 4 (1796) form British History Online
 

 

Extinct baronetcies in the Baronetage of England
1611 establishments in England